McMickle Cut is the longest cut on the Lackawanna Cut-Off railroad line in northwest New Jersey.  It was built between 1908 and 1911 by contractor Timothy Burke between mileposts 47.1 and 48.1 where Stanhope and Byram Township meet. Some 600,000 cubic yards of material was removed by dynamite and other methods to make the cut, which is 1.04 miles (1.7 km) long, has an average depth of 29 feet (8.9 m), and a maximum depth of 54 feet (16.6 m). 

McMickle Cut, the first major cut west of Port Morris Junction on the Cut-Off, begins just west of County Road 602 (site of a future grade crossing) in Hopatcong.  Sussex County Road 605 (Sparta-Stanhope Road) crosses over the Cut-Off about midway between the ends of the cut (MP 47.8), near its deepest point, where the line is on a 2° curve (70 mph, 113 km/hr).  
 
Formerly, CR 605 crossed the Cut-Off on a one-lane bridge that was completed in 1911.  Although the original bridge (known as K-07) still exists—it carries an adjacent hiking trail—it was considered functionally obsolete (although not functionally deficient) and was replaced by a modern two-lane bridge of similar design that opened on September 30, 2008.  The old bridge was also rehabilitated at the time of the building of the new bridge.

McMickle Cut is within the section of the Cut-Off that is being rebuilt by NJ Transit for rail service to Andover, which is slated to open in 2018. Lack of maintenance has allowed the area to drain increasingly poorly and meet the technical definition of wetlands. It is thought that its creation unearthed an underground stream not on the 1906 survey map.
  

McMickle Cut is named for John McMickle, who owned most of the land that became the cut.

Chuck Walsh President, North Jersey Rail Commuter Association presented photographs taken by Watson Bunnell D,L&W(1905-1919) on December 1, 1909 showing the area just west of County Road 602 part of Section 1 of the Lackawanna Cut-Off as being named the Huyler Cut after the family who owned that section of land.

References 

Lackawanna Cut-Off